Echinopsis clavata,  is a species of Echinopsis found in Bolivia .

References

External links
 
 

clavata